Isaline Blew Horner OBE (30 March 1896 – 25 April 1981), usually cited as I. B. Horner, was an English Indologist, a leading scholar of Pali literature and late president of the Pali Text Society (1959–1981).

Life
On 30 March 1896 Horner was born in Walthamstow in Essex, England. Horner was a first cousin once removed of the British Theravada monk Ajahn Amaro.

Cambridge years
In 1917, at the University of Cambridge's women's college Newnham College, Horner was awarded the title of a B.A. in moral sciences.

After her undergraduate studies, Horner remained at Newnham College, becoming in 1918 an assistant librarian and then, in 1920, acting librarian. In 1921, Horner traveled to Ceylon (Sri Lanka), India and Burma where she was first introduced to Buddhism, its literature and related languages. In 1923, Horner returned to England, where she accepted a Fellowship at Newnham College and became its librarian.  In 1928, she became the first Sarah Smithson Research Fellow in Pali Studies.  In 1930, she published her first book, Women Under Primitive Buddhism. In 1933, she edited her first volume of Pali text, the third volume of the Papancasudani (Majjhima Nikaya commentary). In 1934, Horner was awarded the title of an M.A. from Cambridge. From 1939 to 1949, she served on Cambridge's Governing Body.

From 1926 to 1959, Horner lived and traveled with her companion "Elsie," Eliza Marian Butler (18851959).

PTS years
In 1936, due to Butler's accepting a position at Manchester University, Horner left Newnham to live in Manchester.  There, Horner completed the fourth volume of the Papancasudani (published 1937).  In 1938, she published the first volume of a translation of the Vinaya Pitaka. (She was to publish a translation of the last Vinaya Pitaka volume in 1966.)

In 1942, Horner became the Honorary Secretary of the Pali Text Society (PTS). In 1943, in response to her parents' needs and greater PTS involvement, Horner moved to London where she lived until her death. In 1959, she became the Society's President and Honorary Treasurer.

Honors
In 1964, in recognition of her contributions to Pali literature, Horner was awarded an honorary Ph.D by Ceylon University.

In 1977, Horner received a second honorary Ph.D from Nava Nalanda Mahavihara.

In 1980, Queen Elizabeth II made Horner an Officer of the Order of the British Empire (OBE) for her lifelong contribution to Buddhist literature.

Books
Horner's books (ordered by first identified publication date) include:

 Women under primitive Buddhism : laywomen and almswomen (1930/1975) 
 Papañcasūdanī: Majjhimanikāyaṭṭhakathā of Buddhaghosâcariya (1933) 
 Early Buddhist theory of man perfected : a study of the Arahan concept and of the implications of the aim to perfection in religious life, traced in early canonical and post-canonical Pali literature (1936/1975)
 Book of the discipline (Vinaya-pitaka) (1938), translated by I. B. Horner
 Alice M. Cooke, a memoir (1940)
Early Buddhism And The Taking Of Life (1945/1967)
 Madhuratthavilāsinī nāma Buddhavaṃsaṭṭhakathā of Bhadantâcariya Buddhadatta Mahāthera (1946/1978), ed. by I.B. Horner.  
 Living thoughts of Gotama the Buddha (1948/2001), by Ananda K. Coomaraswamy and I.B. Horner
 Collection of the Middle Length Sayings (1954)
 Ten Jātaka stories (1957) 
Women In Early Buddhist Literature (1961)
 Early Buddhist poetry (1963)
 Milinda's questions (1963), translated by I. B. Horner
 Buddhist texts through the ages (1964/1990), translated and edited by Edward Conze in collaboration with I.B. Horner, David Snellgrove, Arthur Waley
 Minor anthologies of the Pali Canon (vol. 4): Vimanavatthu and Petavatthu (1974), translated by I. B. Horner 
Noble Quest: Ariyapariyesana Sutta (1974)
 Minor anthologies of the Pali Canon (vol. 3): Buddhavamsa and Cariyapitaka (1975), translated by I. B. Horner
 Apocryphal birth-stories (Paññāsa Jātaka) (1985), translated by I.B. Horner and Padmanabh S. Jaini
The Blessed One's City Of Dhamma: From the Milindapañha  (1993), translated by I.B. Horner and N.K.G. Mendis (Buddhist Publication Society, Bodhi Leaves No. 130)

See also
 Pali Text Society
 Ajahn Amaro

References

Sources
 Boucher, Sandy (2007). "Appreciating the Lineage of Buddhist Feminist Scholars", in Rosemary Radford Ruether (ed.) Feminist Theologies (2007). Minneapolis: Fortress Press. . Retrieved 2008-08-21 from
 Burford, Grace (2005). "Newnham Biographies: Isaline B. Horner (1896-1981)." Retrieved 2008-08-21 from "Newnham College" at
 
 Jayetilleke, Rohan L. (2007). "The pioneer Pali scholar of the West." Retrieved 2008-08-20 from "Associated Newspapers of Ceylon".
 Norman, K.R. (1982). Isaline Blew Horner (1896-1981) (Obituary), Journal of the International Association of Buddhist Studies 5 (2), 145-149
 University of Cambridge (2007). "Isaline Blew Horner (1896-1981), Pali scholar." Retrieved 2008-08-20.
 Watts, Sheila (2006). "Newnham Biographies: Eliza Marian (Elsie) Butler (1885 – 1959)". Retrieved 2008-08-21

1896 births
1981 deaths
Alumni of Newnham College, Cambridge
English Indologists
Linguists of Pali
Pali–English translators
20th-century translators
Traditionalist School